"The Don" is the fourth single by Dundee band The View, it was released on 23 April 2007 as a double A-side along with "Skag Trendy". It follows the singles "Wasted Little DJs", "Superstar Tradesman" and "Same Jeans", and is taken from the debut album Hats Off to the Buskers. The single did not do as well as its predecessors, only entering as far as the UK Top 40, reaching a disappointing #33 in the UK Singles Chart. However, this was to be their final UK Top 40 single so far as their next four singles were to miss the UK Top 40 altogether.

Charts

Track listing
UK CD

  "The Don"
  "Skag Trendy"
  "I've Just Seen a Face"
  "The Don (Video)"
  "Skag Trendy (Video)"

UK 7" (clear orange)

  "The Don"
  "Fireworks & Flowers (Live from The Royal Albert Hall)"

References

2007 singles
The View (band) songs
2007 songs
Songs written by Kyle Falconer
Songs written by Kieren Webster